The German Society of Cinematographers (abbreviated "BVK"), was founded in 1980 as a non-profit professional association of German freelance cinematographers and directors of photography and their collaborators.

Aims and objectives 
The BVK presents, administers and promotes its members' professional and financial interests in conjunction with allied professional bodies in the audiovisual field. It seeks recognition for the standing of the profession and promotes its public media image. The BVK also concerns itself with strengthening the profession's influence in the film world and has broken new ground as far as the recognition and application of cinematographic authorship is concerned. Furthermore, it promotes working conditions which guarantee artistic and creative output.

Activities and memberships 
Working together with the equipment factories through seminars and workshops the BVK widens its members' qualifications while encouraging technical innovation. The personal contacts among its members have led to an exchange of ideas and experiences which have done much to reduce competitiveness and open up new perspectives. The BVK is a founding member of the European Federation of Cinematographers/IMAGO and tries to intensify the international cooperation of directors of photography. The CameraGuide, published annually, and BVK's website provide a source of information on members' qualifications and standing.

External links 
 German Society of Cinematography, BVK
 CameraGuide of the BVK
 European Federation of Cinematographers / IMAGO
 Alex Kinter: Film Director and Cinematographer

Cinematography organizations
Film-related professional associations